Lucio Ianiero (born 13 December 1966) is a Canadian retired soccer player and coach who played in the Canadian Soccer League, American Professional Soccer League, Canadian National Soccer League, National Professional Soccer League, and the Canadian Professional Soccer League.

Club career
Ianiero played for the Hamilton Steelers in the original Canadian Soccer League and was the league's 12th best scorer in 1988 with 9 goals. In 1992, he joined the London Lasers. After the demise of the CSL he played in the American Professional Soccer League for the Toronto Blizzard in 1993, and featured in 23 matches. When the Blizzards folded he signed with Toronto Rockets in 1994, and featured in seven matches and recorded one goal.

He also played indoor soccer for the Toronto Shooting Stars of the National Professional Soccer League, where he appeared in 17 matches and recorded five goals.

International career
Ianiero participated in the 1985 FIFA World Youth Championship and the inaugural 1989 Futsal World Cup in the Netherlands. He made his senior debut for Canada in an August 1986 Merlion Cup match against Singapore and went on to earn 17 caps.

Coaching career
Ianiero served as an assistant coach for St. Catharines Roma Wolves in 1997. In 2000, he was named Canadian Professional Soccer League Coach of the Year, as head coach of the St. Catharines Wolves.  In 2001, he helped lead the Wolves to the league title.  He was the team's player-coach from at least 2000 to 2006. On August 12, 2015 Brock University appointed Ianiero head coach for the men's soccer team.

Retirement
Ianeiro is currently a high school teacher at St. Catharines Collegiate Institute and Vocational School, as well as coaching at St. Catharines Jets Girls Soccer Club.
Ianiero also coaches one of the province's top 1999 girls teams with the Niagara Regional Soccer Program, where he also serves as one of the technical directors. In 2018, he was inducted into the Hamilton Soccer Hall of Fame.

References

External links

1966 births
Living people
Soccer players from Toronto
Canadian people of Italian descent
Association football midfielders
Canadian soccer players
Canada men's international soccer players
Canadian men's futsal players 
Hamilton Steelers (1981–1992) players
London Lasers players
Toronto Blizzard (1986–1993) players
Toronto Rockets players
St. Catharines Roma Wolves players
Canadian Soccer League (1987–1992) players
American Professional Soccer League players
Canadian Soccer League (1998–present) players
Canada men's youth international soccer players
Toronto Shooting Stars players
National Professional Soccer League (1984–2001) players
Canadian soccer coaches
Canadian Soccer League (1998–present) managers
Canadian National Soccer League players